The Gamshag is a mountain in the Kitzbühel Alps in the Austrian state of Tyrol whose summit reaches a height of .

The Gamshag is located northwest of the Torsee lake, the source of the River Saalach. The prominent peak of the Tristkogel rises to the northeast. To the northwest are the Kleine Schütz and the Schützkogel; to the south is the 2,174 m high Teufelssprung ("Devil's Leap").

The Gamshag is easily accessed over well-signposted hiking trails both from the west from Jochberg as well as from the Saalach valley to the east. In winter the mountain can also be climbed as part of a ski tour.

References 

Mountains of the Alps
Mountains of Tyrol (state)
Two-thousanders of Austria
Kitzbühel Alps